Flechas Negras Division was a division of the Nationalist forces during the Spanish Civil War.  The name means "Black Arrows" in Spanish.

It was a Blackshirts division created when the Flechas Division was further strengthened with support units and renamed. It served in the Catalonia Offensive, the final offensive of the Spanish Civil War. Italians from the Corpo Truppe Volontarie served in these mixed Italo-Spanish Flechas (Arrows) units where the Italians provided the officers and technical personnel, while the Spanish served in the rank-and-file.

Order of battle

Flechas Negras Division - Col. Valentino Babini
 1st Regiment
 1st Battalion "Monte Jata"
 2nd Battalion "Bermeo"
 3rd Battalion "Munguia"
 Battery of 65/17
 2nd Regiment
 1st Battalion "Peña Amarilla"
 2nd Battalion "Santoña"
 3rd Battalion "Algorta"
 Battery of 65/17
 Fusilier Battalion "Laredo"
 Independent Fusilier Battalion
 Battalion de maquinas
 1st Machinegun Company
 2nd Machinegun Company
 3rd Machinegun Company
 4th Mortar Company
 Auto Company
 Artillery Regiment
 Group of 65/17
 Group of 75/27 "Vizcaya"
 Group of 100/17
 20mm Battery
 Engineer Battalion
 Logistics Company

See also
 Flechas Azules Division
 Flechas Verdes Division

Sources
de Mesa, José Luis, El regreso de las legiones: (la ayuda militar italiana a la España nacional, 1936–1939),  García Hispán, Granada:España, 1994 

Divisions of Italy in the Spanish Civil War
Blackshirt divisions of Italy
Military units and formations established in 1937